Elana Johnson is an American author and also writes under the names of Liz Isaacson and Jessie Newtown. Her works of young adult fiction and romance have appeared on USA Today's bestseller list three times. Johnson is a Utah-based writer with over 100 works to her credit.

Background
She studied math and science in school and college, and is the technology specialist at a school in Pleasant Grove, Utah. Her husband is a teacher; they have two children. She started writing in late 2007, and published Possession in 2011.

Her From the Query to the Call is a guide for aspiring writers, and she co-founded the QueryTracker blog and also blogs at The League of Extraordinary Writers.

Writing career

As Elana Johnson
Under the name Elana Johnson, she has written for young adults and adults. The speculative fiction Possession series for young adults includes three dystopian novels, a novella, and a short story prequel; she said in 2011 that she hoped to make readers think for themselves and deliberately had her protagonist question what she was told from the start.

In 2014 she published Elevated, her first contemporary teen romance; Both Elevated and Something About Love, also published in 2014, are verse novels.

Later works include a duology entitled Rift Walkers, three novels in the Elemental romance series, two novels in the Redwood Bay adult contemporary romance series, published in 2016 and 2017, and Echoes of Silence, which is adult fantasy.

As Liz Isaacson
Under the name Liz Isaacson, she writes inspirational romance novels, including several series, of which her first was the Three Rivers Ranch Romance series, and the novella Starting Over at Steeple Ridge. She also wrote A Dash of Love, based on the 2017 television film.

Publications as Elana Johnson

Trilogy
Possession trilogy
 Possession (June 2011)
 Surrender (June 2012)
 Abandon (June 2013)
 Regret (novella) (February 2012)
 Resist (short story) (December 2011)

Verse novels
 Elevated (2014)
 Something About Love (2014)

Elemental series
 Elemental Rush
 Elemental Hunger
 Elemental Release

Rift Walkers
 Rift
 Mend

Redwood Bay
 Until Summer Ends (2016)
 Until Winter Breaks (2017)

Adult fantasy
Echoes of Silence (2020)

Other works
 From the Query to the Call
 Open for Love (novella)
 Under Your Spell (anthology)
 All Hallows' Eve (anthology)

Publications as Liz Isaacson

Three Rivers Ranch series
 Second Chance Ranch (2015)
 Third Time's the Charm (2015)
 Fourth and Long (2016)
 Fifth Generation Cowboy (2016)
 Sixth Street Love Affair (2016)
 The Seventh Sergeant (2016)
 Eight Second Ride (2016)
 The First Lady of Three Rivers Ranch (2016)
 Christmas in Three Rivers (2016)
 Lucky Number Thirteen (2017)
 The Curse of February Fourteenth (2018)
 Fifteen Minutes of Fame (2018)
 Sixteen Steps to Fall in Love (2018)
 The Sleigh on Seventeenth Street (2018)

Gold Valley series
 Before the Leap (2016)
 After the Fall (2017)
 Through the Mist (2017)
 Between the Reins (2017)
 Over the Moon (2017)
 Under the Bridge (2017)
 Up on the Housetop (2018)
 Around the Bend (2018)

Other romance series
 Brush Creek Brides (from 2017)
 Buttars Brothers (from 2017)
 Grape Seed Falls (from 2017)
 Christmas in Coral Canyon (from 2018)
 Quinn Valley Ranch (from 2018)
 Last Chance Ranch Romance (from 2019)
 Horseshoe Home Ranch (from 2019)
 Steeple Ridge Romance (from 2019)
 Seven Sons Ranch in Three Rivers (from 2019)
 Shiloh Ridge Ranch in Three Rivers Romance (from 2020)
 Christmas at Whiskey Mountain Lodge (from 2020)

Other romance books
 Curl Up With A Cowboy (co-authored omnibus, 2016)
 Ticket to Bride (2017)
 Fractured Slipper (Fairy Tale Ink, 2018)
 A Dash of Love (novelization, 2018)
 Take a Cowboy Home for Christmas (omnibus, 2019)
 Her Cowboy Billionaire (omnibus, 2020)
 Cowboy Valentines (2020)

References

External links
 Elana Johnson website
 Liz Isaacson website

Living people
American writers of young adult literature
American romantic fiction novelists
Novelists from Utah
Year of birth missing (living people)